Slapsko is a municipality and village in Tábor District in the South Bohemian Region of the Czech Republic. It has about 100 inhabitants.

Administrative parts
Villages and hamlets of Javor, Leština, Moraveč, Slupy, Vitanovice and Zahrádka are administrative parts of Slapsko.

References

Villages in Tábor District